Patrick Ernest Matlock (born July 3, 1965) is a United States Army lieutenant general who serves as the Army's G-3/5/7 (deputy chief of staff for operations, plans and training) of the Army Staff since October 2022. He most recently served as the Assistant Chief of Staff for Operations of the United Nations Command, ROK/US Combined Forces Command, and United States Forces Korea. Previously, he was the Commanding General of the 1st Armored Division.

Military career
Born in Yuba City, California, Matlock graduated from the United States Military Academy with a B.S. degree in 1988 and was assigned to the 1st Cavalry Division at Fort Hood.

Matlock was nominated and confirmed for promotion to lieutenant general in April 2021, but he never assumed the rank. In September 2022, he was again nominated and confirmed for promotion to lieutenant general and appointment as deputy chief of staff for operations, plans, and training of the U.S. Army.

Personal
Matlock married Jacqueline Damaris "Jacqy" Franks on September 12, 1992. She is the daughter of General Tommy Franks. Matlock and his wife have three children.

Notes

References

1965 births
Living people
People from Yuba City, California
United States Military Academy alumni
Recipients of the Distinguished Service Medal (US Army)
Recipients of the Defense Superior Service Medal
Recipients of the Legion of Merit
United States Army generals
United States Army personnel of the Gulf War
United States Army personnel of the Iraq War
United States Army personnel of the War in Afghanistan (2001–2021)